Timezone is an international chain of family entertainment centres and amusement arcade centres based in Australia. It is owned and operated by The Entertainment and Education Group (TEEG). Outside of Australia, Timezone is currently operating in India, New Zealand, Singapore, the Philippines, Indonesia and Vietnam.

History
The first Timezone arcade opened in 1978 in Perth, Western Australia, by Leisure & Allied Industries (now LAI Games). Timezone claims that it is the first family-oriented amusement centers of that time, and said that its family emphasis is the key focus of their brand.

In 1995, Timezone started their ventures outside Australia.

In December 2017, TEEG announced that they had purchased the bowling and entertainment division of Ardent Leisure in order to merge it with its Timezone entertainment business, forming a combined entertainment group encompassing Timezone, AMF, Kingpin and Playtime, one of the world's largest family entertainment centre groups. TEEG operates in six countries with over 250 locations. All AMF bowling centres in Australia were rebranded as Zone Bowling. Centres in New Zealand were rebranded Xtreme Entertainment. In November 2018, TEEG purchased all PLAYTIME venues and slowly rebranded them to Timezone with the last PLAYTIME converted to Timezone in June 2019.

In February 2019, TEEG opened its first of many dual branded venues of Zone Bowling and Timezone locations in Westfield Garden City.

In 2019, TEEG began rebranding their existing New Zealand bowling centres, Xtreme Entertainment, as dual-branded Zone Bowling and Timezone venues, beginning with their Garden City (Christchurch) venue.

In July 2021, After 20 years, TEEG made Timezone's return into South Australia by opening up a dual branded venue in Woodville, SA. In the same month, TEEG made a deal to purchase all TunzaFun locations in South Australia and Victoria and rebrand these to under Timezone venues, with Tea Tree Plaza, Elizabeth and Fountain Gate stores to be the first to be rebranded.

Powercard

Timezone arcade system moved to a magnetic swipecard system known as the Timezone Powercard. This meant that customers, rather than having to carry many coins around, could simply deposit a larger amount of money (for example, $10) onto their Powercard account. In order to use an arcade machine, they simply had to swipe their card through a detector located on the machine, and the credit would be deduced from the card account. This system was supplied by Australian company Embed International. Tap-to-play cards are now currently available in the Singapore, Philippine and Vietnam franchises and are beginning to be rolled out across Australian franchises as of December 2018. In the Philippines however, the cards are hybrid tap-and-swipe as not all branches have tap card compatibility yet.

In 2004, paper tickets for ticket redemption arcade machines were replaced with electronic tickets automatically loading on the card. Eventually, tickets were now dispensing again instead of automatically loading on the card, prevalent in the India, Philippines and Singapore franchises. In the India and Philippines franchises, a rare golden ticket allows the player to earn an extra 1000 tickets.

As of 2005, Timezone Powerclub credit in Australia lasted one year from the date of credit and the cards could only be used at the original store of purchase.

As of 2008, after many Timezone stores closed, balances can be used at any venue regardless of where the credit was put on. However, in order to progress to the higher Powerclub levels, customers can only put credit on at the venue which issued the card, or in some franchises, Fun Points can be earned by loading a specific number to reach a certain threshold for upgrade. The exception to this is where the issuing venue has subsequently closed down and a new "home venue" has been selected. Fun Points, which is used in Philippine-based stores, have been abolished on 2022 in favor of a new uniform Timezone Rewards system (also used in other countries) which allows earning of rewards and progression to higher levels freely.

Timezone Rewards
Timezone Rewards is Timezone's loyalty program which offers incentives and benefits according to membership tiers or levels. Qualifying criteria for each tier varies from country to county. The structure in Australia, New Zealand, The Philippines and Singapore is reflected as:

Welcome tier
The Timezone Welcome Powercard is the entry tier where members start accumulating reward credits and receiving benefits. The Powercard for this tier is red.

Blue Elite tier 
The Blue Elite is the second tier, upgraded from a Welcome tier, issued when a set cumulative amount has been loaded onto a Powercard. This card offers discounts and extra benefits.

Gold tier
The Gold tier issued when a set cumulative amount is attained. The Gold tier offers a host of benefits such as bonus game credits, e-tickets, discounts and other exclusive offers.

Platinum tier
The Timezone Platinum tier is the highest level and most exclusive reward level. This tier offers VVIP pricing on game play and a lot more freebies such as free games everyday, complimentary drinks and more.

References

External links
Timezone Australia
Timezone Indonesia
Timezone India
Timezone New Zealand
Timezone Philippines
Timezone Singapore
Timezone Vietnam

Leisure companies of Australia
Video arcades
Companies based in Perth, Western Australia
Entertainment companies established in 1978
1978 establishments in Australia